A list of films produced in Brazil in 2005 (see 2005 in film):

2005

See also
2005 in Brazil
2005 in Brazilian television

2005
Films
Brazilian